The IRIS-T ("InfraRed Imaging System Tail/Thrust Vector-Controlled") is a medium range infrared homing missile available in both air-to-air and ground defence surface-to-air variants.

The missile was developed in the late 1990s–early 2000s by a German-led program to develop a short to medium range infrared homing air-to-air missile to replace the AIM-9 Sidewinder in use by some NATO member countries at the time. A goal of the program was for any aircraft capable of firing the Sidewinder to also be capable of launching the IRIS-T. The air-to-air variant was fielded in 2005.

Surface-to-air defence systems variants came later, with the short-range IRIS-T SLS fielded in 2015, and the medium-range IRIS-T SLM fielded in 2022. The command vehicle integrates multiple radar sources, and is able to launch and track all 24 missiles simultaneously. The IRIS-T SLM can counter surface-to-air missiles and cruise missiles, including low-flying, stealthy missiles such as the Kalibr.

History

Background 
In the 1980s, NATO countries signed a Memorandum of Agreement that the United States would develop a medium-range air-to-air missile to replace the AIM-7 Sparrow, while the UK and Germany would develop a short-range air-to-air missile to replace the AIM-9 Sidewinder. The US design developed as the AIM-120 AMRAAM, while the UK-German design developed as the AIM-132 ASRAAM.

The roots of the ASRAAM date back to 1968 when development began on the Hawker Siddeley SRAAM ('Taildog'). This project ended in 1974 with no production orders. This work was dusted off for the UK-German effort, with the Germans providing a new seeker, and the UK providing most of the remaining components. 

After German reunification in 1990, Germany found itself with large stockpiles of the Soviet Vympel R-73 missiles (NATO reporting name: AA-11 Archer) carried by the MiG-29 Fulcrum and concluded that the AA-11's capabilities had been noticeably underestimated. In particular, it was found to be both far more maneuverable, and far more capable in terms of seeker acquisition and tracking than the latest AIM-9 Sidewinder. In 1990, Germany withdrew from the ASRAAM project, while the UK resolved to find another seeker and develop ASRAAM according to the original range requirement this ultimately led to the ASRAAM gaining a significantly more capable 128x128 focal array seeker with IRCCM (infrared counter counter measures) capability, similar performance and notably half the unit cost of the IRIS-T due to the development work that had already been completed on the missile body.

In 1987 after years of silence on the program the US proposed a requirement that the weapon must use Sidewinder rails rather than the universal aircraft rail adaptor named the Missile Support Unit that had been developed, this forced a one year delay as the British, German and Norwegian proposals were redesigned then in late 1990 after German Reunification and fearing erosion of its industrial base the US again disruptively proposed it would choose the latest version of its existing Sidewinder design with increased maneuverability and IRCCM unless the European partners increased the US industrial workshare, this program was designated AIM-9X. The Sidewinder upgrade proposal however failed to interest the NATO buyers and in 1992 each ultimately went their separate ways with the UK the ASRAAM, France the MBDA Mica, US the AIM-9X and Germany elected to restart development on all but the seeker leading to the Iris-T.

Development 
In 1995, Germany announced the start of the IRIS-T development, in collaboration with Greece, Italy, Norway, Sweden and Canada. Canada later dropped out, while in 2003 Spain joined as a partner for procurement. The German Air Force took first delivery of the missile in December 2005.

The respective share of the development of the IRIS-T are:
Germany 46%
Italy 19%
Sweden 18%
Greece 13%
4% split between Canada and Norway.

Missile characteristics
In comparison to the AIM-9M Sidewinder, the IRIS-T has higher ECM-resistance and flare suppression. Improvements in target discrimination allow for 5 to 8 times longer head-on firing range than the AIM-9M. It can engage targets behind the launching aircraft, made possible by extreme close-in agility, allowing turns of 60 g at a rate of 60°/s via thrust vectoring and LOAL capability.

The IRIS-T is able to intercept fast-moving and miniature targets, such as air-to-air/surface-to-air missiles and air-to-surface/surface-to-surface missiles and rockets, UAV/drones, and cruise missiles. To improve the probability of a direct hit, the missile is equipped with an active radar proximity fuze.

The IRIS-T has the unique ability, in comparison to other similar missiles such as the AIM-9X, to target and shoot down other air-to-air and surface-to-air missiles, thus offering a 360° defence capability. Surface launched variants of the IRIS-T, the IRIS-T SLS and IRIS-T SLM, have enhanced capabilities to destroy aircraft, helicopters, cruise missiles, air-to-surface missiles, anti-ship missiles, anti-radar rockets and large-calibre rockets. They have a high probability of a killing shot against UAVs and other small manoeuvring threats at very-short and medium-range distances.

The Royal Norwegian Air Force (RNoAF) has tested a new air-to-surface capability developed by Diehl BGT Defence for the IRIS-T. A proof of concept test firing to acquire, track, and engage a target representing a small fast attack boat was conducted in Norway in September 2016, where the IRIS-T missile was launched from an RNoAF F-16AM multirole aircraft. For the air-to-surface role, the missile retains the same standard IRIS-T AAM hardware configuration, including the HE warhead and IIR guidance package, with only an updated software insertion required to deliver the additional ground attack capability. This basic air-to-ground capability provides the ability to acquire, track and engage individual ground targets like boats, ships, small buildings and vehicles.

Variants

IDAS

The IDAS variant is a navalized version of the missile, and is also being developed for the new Type 212A submarine of the German Navy. IDAS is supposed to engage air threats, small or medium surface vessels or near land targets.

Ground-to-air 

As a part of the NATO MEADS program, the German Air Force and others are now using a surface-launched (SL) radar-guided version of the missile, called IRIS-T SL. It has a pointed nose, unlike the regular IRIS-T, with a jettisonable drag-reducing nose cone. The missile uses a GPS-aided inertial navigation system, with radar data link for command guidance during the initial approach. The interference-resistant IR seeker head is activated at the terminal stage. 

Compared to the IRIS-T, the diameter of the rocket motor was increased by 25 mm, to 152 mm. Test launches from a battery consisting of a CEA CEAFAR radar, a Diehl IRIS-T SL launcher and an Oerlikon Skymaster battle management system were performed in 2014. The IRIS-T SL qualification tests were completed in January 2015 at the Denel Overberg Test Range in South Africa.

By 2022, two variants were available: IRIS-T SLS (short-range) with 12 km range and altitude and IRIS-T SLM (medium range) with 40 km range and 20 km maximum altitude. A third variant, IRIS-T SLX (long range) variant with a dual-mode (IR and RF) seeker, a range of 80 km and a maximum altitude of 30 km, is in development as of April 2022. Operational testing of the IRIS-T SLM was completed in January 2022.

The Swedish Army fielded a ground launched version of the IRIS-T SLS, designated Luftvärnsrobotsystem 98 (lvrbs 98), to replace the RBS 70 missile system. Four missiles are carried on Eldenhet 98 (elde 98) launcher, a special version of a Bv 410 tracked, armored vehicle, with Saab Giraffe 1X electronically scanned radar integrated in the front car.

The Norwegian Army has decided to acquire a "Mobile Ground Based Air Defence System" in a direct acquisition with Kongsberg Defence & Aerospace. The deliveries are planned for 2023 and based on IRIS-T launchers from Diehl Defence GmbH and radars from Weibel Scientific A/S. The system will reuse NASAMS command and control and its network solutions, to create a "highly mobile, short-range air defence system". Initial delivery will include six modified M113 vehicles carrying IRIS-T SLS missiles; additional launchers will be based on the ACSV.

IRIS-T SLM can be integrated with a variety of electro-optical/infrared (EO/IR) guidance systems and AESA radars, such as Hensoldt TRML-4D, Thales Ground Master 200 MM/C, CEA CEAFAR, and Saab Giraffe 4A. A version with a Lockheed-Martin Skykeeper command and control station, Giraffe 4A radar and Diehl IRIS-T SLM launcher was shown at IDEX 2019 under the name Falcon Ground Based Air Defence.

Egypt ordered Diehl IRIS-T SLM launchers, Hensoldt TRML-4D radars, and fire and control stations equipped with Airbus Defence Fortion IBMS integrated battle management software, all mounted on MAN 8×8 military trucks; the deal was approved by the German government in December 2021. Further orders includes Hensoldt  passive radars, IRIS-T SLS launchers and IRIS-T SLX long-range missiles. Passive radars can detect enemy aircraft by analysing reflections from external radio and television signals, making them effective in urban areas where active radars struggle .

Air-to-ground
For the air-to-surface role, the only difference from air-to-air version is an updated software insertion required to deliver the additional ground attack capability. Tested by Royal Norwegian Air Force.

Operational usage

It is unclear whether the IRIS-T has shot down a Kh-101 cruise missile. On 19 October 2022, Ukrainian sources stated that a Russian missile was shot down with the help of an IRIS-T air defense system, in Chernihiv Oblast, thirty kilometers from Kyiv. Photos of the wreckage of a IRIS-T missile were shared on social media, and Ukrainian President Volodymyr Zelenskyy has said that IRIS-T "is a really effective system" and "has shown itself very well", there was no evidence that the German IRIS-T SLM shot down that particular missile, and some Ukrainian sources stated that it had been shot down with a different system.

Following a Russian missile attack against Ukraine on 31 October 2022, Ukrainian Air Force stated that IRIS-T missiles had a 100% success rate when countering the attack.

On 15 November footage appeared, which appears to show the downing of two cruise missiles within seconds by an IRIS-T system. One appears to be a Kalibr cruise missile.

Operators 

The following operators are listed and defined as of October 2022.

  25
  IRIS-T missiles for the new Saab JAS 39 Gripen E/F variants.
  7 IRIS-T SLM ground-based air defense systems ordered in 2018. Further order of 400 SLM missiles, 6 IRIS-T SLS systems and 10 IRIS-T SLX systems was approved in December 2021.
  1,250
  350 IRIS-T missiles
  444 IRIS-T missiles budget €217m, between 2003 and 2015.
 150 IRIS-T missiles
 1,400 IRIS-T missiles
 25 IRIS-T missiles delivered as interim armament for Saab JAS 39 Gripen aircraft until the completion of the A-Darter SRAAM project.
  770 IRIS-T missiles. Original budget €247m, final cost €291m.
 450 IRIS-T missiles, designated Jaktrobotsystem 98 (jrbs 98). IRIS-T SLS variant used in ground-based air defense systems.
 220 IRIS-T missiles ordered. to be integrated with Northrop F-5 F-5T Saab Jas 39 Gripen Gripen C/D and F-16 eMLU .
 Germany has pledged to supply Ukraine with IRIS-T SL ground-based air-defense systems. In light of the 10 October 2022 missile strikes on Ukraine, German Defense Minister Christine Lambrecht released a statement in which Germany would send the first of four vehicle-mounted IRIS-T SLM to Ukraine "in the coming days"; the original delivery date was the end of the year. The first system, of four promised, was delivered on October 11 according to a source with the German defence ministry. Systems originally designated for Egypt were diverted to Ukraine to speed the delivery.

Future operators
 IRIS-T integration for Hungarian Saab JAS 39 Gripen MS20 Block II modernization program was ordered in December 2021.
 IRIS-T integration for the KF-X fighter program was ordered in 2018.

See also
A-Darter
AAM-5
AIM-9X Sidewinder
ASRAAM
MICA
PL-10
Python 5
R-73
Aster (missile family)

References

Further reading
 Bonds, Ray ed. The Modern US War Machine. New York City: Crown Publishers, 1989. .

External links

 

International air-to-air missiles
Surface-to-air missiles of Germany
Articles containing video clips
Air-to-surface missiles
Military equipment introduced in the 2000s